Vestri may refer to:

 Norðri, Suðri, Austri and Vestri, dwarves in Norse mythology
 Íþróttafélagið Vestri, an Icelandic sports club
 Vestri (football club)
 Vestri men's basketball

People with the surname:
 Archimede Vestri, Italian patriot and architect of the 19th century
 René Vestri (1938–2013), French politician

See also 
 Vestris (disambiguation)
 Vestry